Augustus M. Goessling (November 17, 1878 – August 22, 1963) was an American water polo player, breaststroke and backstroke swimmer who represented the United States at the 1904 Summer Olympics and 1908 Summer Olympics. He was born and died in St. Louis, Missouri.

In the 1904 Olympics he won a bronze medal as a member of the Missouri Athletic Club water polo team. Four years later he was eliminated in the first round of the 100-meter backstroke, as well as in the first round of the 200-meter breaststroke.

References

External links
  Augustus Goessling – Olympic athlete profile at Sports-Reference.com

1878 births
1963 deaths
Sportspeople from St. Louis
American male water polo players
American male backstroke swimmers
American male breaststroke swimmers
Olympic bronze medalists for the United States in water polo
Olympic swimmers of the United States
Swimmers at the 1908 Summer Olympics
Water polo players at the 1904 Summer Olympics
Medalists at the 1904 Summer Olympics
19th-century American people
20th-century American people

ru:Водное поло на летних Олимпийских играх 1904#Составы команд